Luteimonas aquatica is a species of yellow-pigmented bacteria. It is Gram-negative, rod-shaped and non-spore-forming, with type strain RIB1-20(T) (=BCRC 17731(T) =LMG 24212(T)).

References

Further reading
Whitman, William B., et al., eds. Bergey’s Manual® of Systematic Bacteriology. Vol. 2. Springer, 2012.

External links

LPSN
Type strain of Luteimonas aquatica at BacDive -  the Bacterial Diversity Metadatabase

Xanthomonadales
Gram-negative bacteria
Bacteria described in 2008